Gulliver's Travels (German: Gullivers Reisen) is a 1924 Austrian silent adventure film directed by Géza von Cziffra and starring Eugen Neufeld, Liesl Stillmark and Gyula Szöreghy. It is based on the 1726 novel Gulliver's Travels by the Anglo-Irish writer Jonathan Swift.

The film's sets were designed by the art director József Pán.

Cast
Eugen Neufeld as Lemuel Gulliver
Liesl Stillmark
Gyula Szöreghy
Hans Heinz Theyer
Ferike Vidor

References

External links

1924 films
1920s unfinished films
1924 adventure films
Austrian adventure films
Austrian black-and-white films
Austrian silent feature films
Films based on Gulliver's Travels
Films directed by Géza von Cziffra
Puppet films
Silent adventure films
Silent horror films
1920s German-language films